The Crown is a Swedish death metal band from Trollhättan, active from 1990 to 2004, and again since 2009.

History 
Originally, they used the name Crown of Thorns but were forced to change their name due to an American band already using that name. Their music and lyrics are inspired by death, antireligious themes (mostly targeting Christianity) and rebellion. They are known to fuse melodic death metal with aggressive old-school death metal tendencies and considerable thrash metal influences, reminiscent of bands such as Possessed and old Sepultura. The Crown disbanded in 2004. After that, Lindstrand went on to form One Man Army and the Undead Quartet. Tervonen formed Angel Blake, named after a song by Danzig. Sunesson is in a band called Engel. Olsfelt is also in a band called Stolen Policecar. The band was reformed in December 2009 with Jonas Stålhammar of God Macabre as the new vocalist.

On 30 June 2010, it was reported that The Crown signed a worldwide deal with Century Media Records and the band's eighth studio album, Doomsday King, was released in September 2010.

The Crown celebrated their 25th anniversary with the release of their ninth studio album, Death Is Not Dead on 12 January 2015. The first single "Headhunter" was released on 27 October 2014 as well as the music video was made on the same date.

On 28 November 2017, it was announced that The Crown had returned to Metal Blade Records, and released the first single "Iron Crown" from their then-upcoming tenth studio album Cobra Speed Venom, on 12 January 2018. On that album, The Crown used a string quartet with Alexander Bringsoniou playing violin, viola and cello. Their eleventh studio album, Royal Destroyer, was released 12 March 2021.

Members 

Current line-up
Marko Tervonen – rhythm guitar (1990–2004, 2009–present)
Johan Lindstrand – vocals (1990–2001, 2002–2004, 2011–present)
Robin Sörqvist – lead guitar (2013–present)
Mattias Rasmussen – bass (2022–present)
Mikael Norén – drums (2022–present)

Former members
Magnus Olsfelt – bass (1990–2004, 2009–2022)
Janne Saarenpää – drums (1990–2004, 2009–2014)
Robert Österberg – lead guitar (1990–1993)
Marcus Sunesson – lead guitar (1993–2004, 2009–2013)
Tomas Lindberg – vocals (2001–2002)
Jonas Stålhammar – vocals (2009–2011)
Henrik Axelsson – drums (2014–2022)

Timeline

Discography

Albums 
The Burning (1995 as Crown of Thorns)
Eternal Death (1997 as Crown of Thorns)
Hell Is Here (1999)
Deathrace King (2000)
Crowned in Terror (2002)
Possessed 13 (2003)
Crowned Unholy (2004)
Doomsday King (2010)
Death Is Not Dead (2015)
Cobra Speed Venom (2018)
Royal Destroyer (2021)

Demos 
Forever Heaven Gone (1993)
Forget the Light (1994)

Videography

DVDs 
The Crown Invades Karlsruhe (2004), pro-shot live show included with Crowned Unholy CD
 14 Years of No Tomorrow (2006), three DVDs consisting of a documentary and live shows

References

External links 

Metal Blade Records' The Crown page (archived)

Swedish thrash metal musical groups
Swedish melodic death metal musical groups
Musical groups established in 1990
Musical groups disestablished in 2004
Musical groups reestablished in 2009
Musical quintets
Metal Blade Records artists